Vagiz Galiulin (also spelled Galiullin; ; born 10 October 1987) is an Uzbekistani footballer who plays as a midfielder. He plays for Russian club FC Neftekhimik Nizhnekamsk.

Career

Uzbek Leagues
He was a trainee of the Uzbek side FC Andijon. He made three appearances there before moving to FK Buxoro, where he made just one appearance.

Rubin Kazan
In 2006, he moved to the reserve team of Rubin Kazan for an unknown fee. He made his debut for FC Rubin Kazan on 7 March 2007 in quarter finals of the Russian Cup against FC Rostov.
On 5 August 2008, he scored his first goal for Rubin in a Russian Cup Round of 32 game against FC Smena Komsomolsk-na-Amure. Rubin reached the final in that edition of the cup, but Galiulin did not play in any rounds other than their first one. He made his debut in the Russian Premier League on 16 November 2008 in a match against CSKA Moscow.

In 2010, he helped FC Rubin Kazan to win the CIS Cup. After this, he spent two seasons on loan with FC Sibir Novosibirsk, making 30 appearances.

In July 2012, he moved on loan to FC Neftekhimik Nizhnekamsk, making 19 appearances and scoring 2 goals.

On 25 July 2013, after a break of three seasons without playing for Rubin's senior team, Galiulin started the second leg of a UEFA Europa League tie against FK Jagodina. He had a bright game, and assisted Gökdeniz Karadeniz to score the only goal of the game.

FC Tosno
He played as FC Tosno won the 2017–18 Russian Cup final against FC Avangard Kursk on 9 May 2018 in the Volgograd Arena.

International career

Galiulin is an Uzbek international with 11 caps to his name. He made his national team debut in September 2008, as a substitute in a 3–0 loss to Qatar.

In 2011, with the Uzbekistan national team, he finished fourth place in the Asian Cup.

Honours

Club
Tosno
 Russian Cup: 2017–18

Career statistics

Notes

References

External links
 Profile at FNL official site
 Russian FA profile 
 Rubin Kazan profile 
 

1987 births
People from Andijan Region
Living people
Uzbekistani footballers
Uzbekistan international footballers
Association football midfielders
FK Andijon players
Buxoro FK players
Traktor Tashkent players
FC Rubin Kazan players
FC Sibir Novosibirsk players
FC Neftekhimik Nizhnekamsk players
FC Ufa players
FC Tosno players
FC Tambov players
Uzbekistan Super League players
Russian Premier League players
Russian First League players
2011 AFC Asian Cup players
Uzbekistani expatriate footballers
Expatriate footballers in Russia
Uzbekistani expatriate sportspeople in Russia